HD 36187, also known as HR 1835, is a solitary, bluish-white hued star located in the southern constellation Columba, the dove. It has an apparent magnitude of 5.55, making it faintly visible to the naked eye under ideal conditions. Based on parallax measurements from the Gaia spacecraft, it is estimated to be 282 light years away from the Solar System. At its current distance, HD 36187's brightness is diminished by 0.21 magnitude due to interstellar dust.

HD 36187 has a stellar classification of either A1 V or A0 V, depending on the source. Nevertheless, both classes indicate that it is an ordinary A-type main-sequence star that is fusing hydrogen in its core. It has double the mass and radius of the Sun. HD 36187 is estimated to be 311 million years old, having completed 66.9% of its main sequence lifetime.

References

A-type main-sequence stars
Columba (constellation)
Columbae, 20
CD-37 02220
036187
025608
1835
High-proper-motion stars